The 1959 Campeonato Centroamericano was the first attempt in an international tournament for the CONCACAF region. All teams that participated were champions of their respective leagues. The tournament was composed of one club from North America and three from Central America.

Teams

North America
 Guadalajara

Central America
 FAS
 Alajuelense
 Olimpia

Matches

Final standings

Olimpia were declared winners had a better goal average (+2, +1).

References

External links 
 CONCACAF Official Site

Campeonato Centroamericano
1959 in association football